You Need a Budget (YNAB) (pronounced ) is an American multi-platform personal budgeting program based on the envelope method. In 2013 it was the most popular personal finance software among Lifehacker readers. It is also listed by Wirecutter for 2021 as a "great pick for hard-core budgeters".

Overview
YNAB is a personal budgeting software platform that can be used across desktop computers, the iPhone and Android operating systems, iPads, Apple Watches, and the Amazon Echo system. 

The general theory of YNAB is to "give every dollar a job". Each dollar is allocated to a specific purpose, such as annual car insurance payment, long-term housing repair fund, college savings, etc. The app encourages users to consider recurring expenses every month to prevent spending "surprises" and break the paycheck-to-paycheck cycle. It encourages users to be flexible in their spending. When overspending occurs, the app encourages users to move money between categories to "roll with the punches" if more funds than allocated are spent in a category. Over time, users are encouraged to "age their money", accumulating savings and watching their money grow. 

Users can either import transactions automatically from their financial institutions or input them manually. The software also displays financial reports to keep users informed about their finances at a glance. The platform also has several open-source add-ons that can expand on YNAB's features.  

YNAB is a paid software program. After the 34-day free trial ends, users pay $98.99 per year, or $14.99 per month. Students who verify their status by providing a school document receive their first year free.

Versions
The latest version, dubbed "The New YNAB" or "nYNAB", was launched December 30, 2015 as a web-based application, with apps for iPhone, iPad, and Android devices. The software is updated multiple times a month to add new features, tweak existing ones, and improve security and back-end functioning.  

The previous version, YNAB4, was released in June 2012. Version 4 was a desktop-based application available for Windows and Mac OS, with apps for iPhone and Android devices. Storing the budget file in Dropbox allowed synchronization between the desktop and mobile applications. Version 4 was maintained through 2016, and the company ended support for Version 4 in October 2019.

YNAB 3 (released December 2009) ran on multiple platforms using the Adobe AIR runtime, and previous versions included a Microsoft Excel/OpenOffice.org Calc spreadsheet implementation (dubbed YNAB Basic and discontinued in July 2009) and a Windows-only executable under the name YNAB Pro (discontinued in December 2009).

YNAB for iPhone was released in 2010 and runs on the iPhone, iPod touch, and iPad. It is not a standalone budgeting application but is instead designed to complement the YNAB for Desktop application.  A version tailored for iPad and including budgeting support was released in 2014. YNAB for Android was released in September 2011.

See also
 List of personal finance software
 Software as a service
 Web application

References

External links
 

2004 software
Accounting software
Cloud applications
Shareware
Web applications